The 2006 NAIA Division I women's basketball tournament was the tournament held by the NAIA to determine the national champion of women's college basketball among its Division I members in the United States and Canada for the 2005–06 basketball season.

Defending champions Union (TN) defeated Lubbock Christian in the championship game, 79–62, to claim the Bulldogs' third NAIA national title.

The tournament was played at the Oman Arena in Jackson, Tennessee.

Qualification

The tournament field remained fixed at thirty-two teams, which were sorted into one of four quadrants and seeded from 1 to 8 within each quadrant. 

The tournament continued to utilize a simple single-elimination format.

Bracket

See also
2006 NAIA Division I men's basketball tournament
2006 NCAA Division I women's basketball tournament
2006 NCAA Division II women's basketball tournament
2006 NCAA Division III women's basketball tournament
2006 NAIA Division II women's basketball tournament

References

NAIA
NAIA Women's Basketball Championships
2006 in sports in Tennessee